The 2011 Rhode Island Rams football team represented the University of Rhode Island in the 2011 NCAA Division I FCS football season. The Rams were led by third year head coach Joe Trainer and played their home games at Meade Stadium. They are a member of the Colonial Athletic Association. They finished the season 3–8, 2–6 in CAA play to finish in eighth place.

Schedule

References

Rhode Island
Rhode Island Rams football seasons
Rhode Island Rams football